In Japanese mythology, Yomotsu Hirasaka is a slope or boundary between this world, where the living live, and the other world, where the dead live (Yomi).

Overview 
The myth, which holds that there is a boundary place between the realms where the living and the dead live, is an idea that is shared by the Sanzu River and others, and can be found throughout the World. In Japanese mythology, Yomotsuhirasaka is thought to be an impression from the stone structure of kofun and the road leading to the stone chamber that housed the coffin.

In Kojiki, it appears twice in the upper part of the book, and there is a tradition that it is located at Ifuyasaka in Izumo Province. The word "hira" is said to mean "cliff".

It is also said to be related to the idea of exorcism.

The goddess Izanami, who was building the country with the male god Izanagi, died after giving birth to Kagutsuchi. Grieving, Izanagi goes to the Land of Yomi to meet her. When Izanagi is reunited with Izanami and asks her to return with him, she tells him that she will consult with the gods of Hades, but that he should never look at her. Numbed by Izanami's reluctance to return, Izanagi lights the teeth of a comb on fire to illuminate the darkness and sees her ugly, rotting form. Enraged, Izanami sends the demoness Ugly Woman of Hades to chase after the fleeing Izanagi, but to no avail, as the ugly woman was distracted by eating the grapes and bamboo shoots he threw at her. Izanami sends Raijin and his army of demons, the Hades Army, instead, but Izanagi flees to Hiraizaka and throws peaches there, which have spiritual power, to repel his pursuers. Finally, Izanami herself gave chase, but Izanagi placed the Rock of Senbiki (a huge stone that would require the strength of a thousand men to move) on Hiraizaka and blocked the way. Enraged, Izanami cried out, "My love, if you do such a terrible thing, I will kill a thousand people a day." Izanagi replied, "My love, then I will build a maternity home and give birth to 1,500 children a day." The two left Hiraizaka and were separated.

It also appears in the story of Okuninushi's visit to the Root Country. In this story, Ouanamuchi (later Okuninushi) is put to various trials by Susanoo of Ne no Kuni, and escapes to Hiraizaka with his beloved Suseribime.

Places of connection 
Shimane Prefecture Matsue City Higashiizumo Town erected a stone monument in 1940 in Iya, Higashiizumo, Shimane as the place where Hiraizumi Hiraizaka was located. A huge stone, said to be the rock of Senbiki, is also placed at the site. Nearby is the Iya Shrine, which is dedicated to Izanami. In the 2010 Cinema of Japan, Matataki, the location was used as a location for the main character's visit to see his dead girlfriend.

According to "Unyo Shishi" written in Edo period, there is also a legend of Izanagi throwing peach fruits to the god of thunder at Komakaerizaka in Iwasaka, Matsue City.

The Legend of Kukurihime 
In a note in Nihon Shoki, it is said that Kukurihime mediated between Izanami and Izanagi, who were arguing on Yomotsuhirasaka. For this reason, Kukurihime is regarded as the god of marriage and harmony.

In popular culture 
Yomotsu Hirasaka is a region in Persona 4

See also 

 Kunado-no-Kami
 Pyramid
 Ziggurat
 Ploutonion - A general term for entrances to the underworld. Many of them are places where poisonous gases are spewed.
 Aornum
 Avernus

References

External links 

 [ 古事記「黄泉比良坂」](小学国史物語 ; 2) / 新免忠著 (紅玉堂書店, 1926)
 [ 出雲神話「黄泉比良坂」]後藤蔵四郎著 (島根県教育会事務所, 1938)
 [ 古事記精選 : 高等国文「根堅洲國」]佐野保太郎編 (育英書院, 1941)
 [ 古事記物語「根堅洲國」]三宅房子著 (金の星社, 1938)

Japanese mythology
Shinto
Mythological places
Afterlife places